Sofya (4th-century), was a queen consort and regent of the Kingdom of Axum.

She was married to king Ella Amida (Ousanas). She was widowed in c. 330, and her son, Ezana of Axum, succeeded her dead husband as king.  As her son was still a child upon his succession, she ruled as regent during his minority.

The official chronicle of the Ethiopian monarchy from 1922 lists Sofya as a reigning monarch in her own right named "Ahywa Sofya", who ruled by herself from 299 to 306 (c. 306–313 on the Gregorian calendar). Archeological evidence for a sole reign of Soyfa is lacking however. This king list claims she was the mother of Abreha and Atsbeha, who are credited with introducing Christianity to Ethiopia. The king list additionally claims that Christianity came to Ethiopia in 327 during a "joint" rule between Sofya and "Abreha Atsbeha". In reality it was Ezana who was the first Christian king of Axum and it has been suggested by some historians that he was a partial inspiration for the legend of Abreha and Atsbeha. The king list thus merges some historical facts with myths by acknowledging Sofya's period of rule in early 4th century but does not mention Ezana until 180 years later under the name "Pazena Ezana". Sofya's husband may appear on the list as the king named "Alameda" that reigned directly before Ezana, although archeologist E. A. Wallis Budge believed this to be a different king named Alla Amidas.

A monarch named "Ahywa" is listed on some king lists reigning directly before Abreha and Atsbeha. A manuscript held in the British Museum as well as a king list recorded by Egyptologist Henry Salt in 1814 both mention a monarch called "Ahywa" who reigned for 3 years, although neither specify the gender of this ruler. The same manuscript additionally claims that the mother of Abreha and Atsbeha was a woman named Eguala Anbasa, who may be the same woman as Sofya but under a different name.

References

People from the Aksumite Empire
4th-century women rulers
4th-century rulers
Regents